Berthella martensi is a species of sea slug, a marine gastropod mollusk in the family Pleurobranchidae.

Description 

The background coloration of the body varies a great deal, from light orange-brown to black or whitish to cream in color. The body is always marked with dark or clear spots, according to what is the dominant background color.
The mantle, which covers the body, is composed of four distinct parts: dorsal, anterior, and two lateral pieces protecting the gills. These lateral pieces are on the right side of the body; they have the same coloration as the body, but are outlined in black.

Three of its dorsal parts can be shed in case of danger, a form of autotomy. This species has another means of defense by secreting a repellent acid fluid.

The head has a pair of smooth and slightly folded rhinophores. A trapezoid veil masks partially the oral cavity.

The egg ribbon is whitish.

Distribution & habitat 
This species is widely distributed throughout the tropical waters of the Indo-West Pacific.
It is usually found among rubble of dead coral in lagoons, or top of the external reef slopes, from the intertidal zone to 25 m depth.

Feeding
Berthella martensi feeds on sponges and tunicates.

Behaviour 
This Berthella species is nocturnal.

References

External links 
 Sous les mers, Berthella martensi

Bibliography 
Coleman,Marine life of the Maldives, Atoll editions,2004,
Beesley, Ross & Wells, Mollusca-The southern synthesis, vol.5, CSIRO, 1998, 
Behrens,Nudibranch behaviour, New World Publication Inc, 2005, 
Cobb & Willan,Undersea jewels - a colour guide to nudibranchs, Australian Biological Resources Study, 2006, 

Pleurobranchidae
Molluscs of the Indian Ocean
Molluscs of the Pacific Ocean
Gastropods described in 1896
Taxa named by Henry Augustus Pilsbry